Chet "JR" White (1979/1980 – October 18, 2020) was an American record producer, musician and mix engineer. He was a member of the indie rock band Girls until their disbandment in 2012. He produced the album Goon by Tobias Jesso Jr. and Sob Story by the Spectrals, among others.

Biography
White was born and raised in Santa Cruz, California. His parents were "supportive and liberal". As a teen, he began playing in punk rock groups, learning about recording, and spending time in record stores. At 13, White was in a band, the Willies, a country punk band. When he was a sophomore in high school, White decided he wanted to be a recording engineer or producer. He attended Cabrillo College, but dropped out.

He later moved to San Francisco, spending most of his 20s there, and attended the now-defunct California Recording Institute, earning a degree in recording engineering. White also briefly set up a studio in a basement space on Market Street. He briefly worked as catering chef at the Zuni Café in San Francisco. In San Francisco, Matt Fishbeck of the band Holy Shit, introduced him to Christopher Owens. The duo would go on to form the band Girls in 2007.

Girls was signed to True Panther Sounds and released their debut album, Album, which was produced by White, on September 22, 2009. The album received praise from critics and was named one of the ten best albums of 2009 by Spin, Rolling Stone, and Pitchfork. In November 2010, the band released an EP titled Broken Dreams Club which was also well received. In 2011, Girls released their second and final studio album, Father, Son, Holy Ghost. The album was co-produced by White. Girls disbanded in 2012 due to personal reasons within the band.

In 2013, White recorded and produced for an album by DIIV, but the session was ultimately scrapped.

White died on October 18, 2020, in Santa Cruz, California, aged 40.

Discography

with Girls
Album – Girls (2009, True Panther Sounds)
Broken Dreams Club – Girls (2010, True Panther Sounds)
Father, Son, Holy Ghost – Girls (2011, True Panther Sounds)

Production credits
Album – Girls (2009, True Panther Sounds)
Broken Dreams Club – Girls (2010, True Panther Sounds)
Father, Son, Holy Ghost – Girls (2011, True Panther Sounds)
It's Glitz – Glitz (2013, Grazer Records)
Sob Story – Spectrals (2013, Wichita)
Big Wheel and Others – Cass McCombs (2013, Domino, mix engineer and recording)
Goon – Tobias Jesso Jr. (2015, True Panther Sounds)
Family Album – Lia Ices (2021, Natural Music)

References

External links
 

20th-century births
2020 deaths
Year of birth uncertain
Record producers from California
21st-century American bass guitarists
Alternative rock bass guitarists
Musicians from Santa Cruz, California
Cabrillo College alumni
Guitarists from California